The women's rhythmic individual all-around gymnastics competition at the 2014 Commonwealth Games in Glasgow, Scotland was held from 24 July to 25 July at the Scottish Exhibition and Conference Centre.

The team competition on 24 July, was also used as the qualifying competition for the individual-all around. 32 athletes participated with the top 16 advancing to the final. However, only two athletes per nation were allowed to progress.

Qualification
Results:

R1 = 1st reserve for final R2 = 2nd reserve for final

Final
Results:

References

Gymnastics at the 2014 Commonwealth Games
2014 in women's gymnastics